Ambu, or officially Ambu A/S, is a Danish company that develops, produces and markets single-use endoscopy solutions, diagnostic and life-supporting equipment to hospitals, private practices, and rescue services.

It was founded in Denmark in 1937, as Testa Laboratorium, by German engineer Holger Hesse.

The largest business areas are anesthesia, cardiology, neurology, pulmonology, urology and gastroenterology. The company's most important products are devices for artificial ventilation, single-use endoscopes and single-use electrodes for ECG tests and neurophysiological mappings.

External links 

 Official website
 LinkedIn page

References 

Health care companies of Denmark
Life science companies based in Copenhagen
Companies based in Ballerup Municipality
Technology companies established in 1937
Danish companies established in 1937